Chongur चोङगुर् is a small village near Muktinath in Mustang District, Nepal. It was founded by a single family from Tibet. Original Chhonguras (people from Chongur) are all descendants of four brothers, therefore the entire village consists of cousins. The villagers and the village itself is regarded in high esteem by neighboring villages as the original founder Lama Chapkeypa was a revered lama (monk), hence the head of every household of the village are also well versed in sacred religious scripts and Buddhist philosophies to pass down the generation.

The population of 200 are Buddhist and speak the Mustangey language.

Populated places in Mustang District